Hwang Jung-eum is a South Korean actress and singer. She rose to stardom through the sitcom High Kick Through the Roof and received her first leading role with television series Listen to My Heart.

Career 
Hwang Jung-eum debuted with K-pop girl group Sugar in 2002 as a lead vocalist, but left the group in 2004 to pursue a solo career. Hwang appeared as one of the recurring guests of the variety show Love Letter from 2004 to 2006, in which her onscreen pairing with Kim Jong-min became popular. She officially made her acting debut in the television drama The Person I Love in 2007.

In 2009, she and real-life boyfriend Kim Yong-jun (of boy band SG Wannabe) joined the second season of reality dating show We Got Married as the first real-life couple to be featured on the show. Later that year, Hwang rose to mainstream stardom when she appeared in the daily sitcom High Kick Through the Roof. Her character in the sitcom as a college student who was full of energetic vibes but sometimes clumsy, confident despite lacking money and opportunities, representing today's college students well, therefore stirred sentiments among many young adults. Regarding this breakout in her acting career, Hwang said:

After her turn on High Kick, Hwang signed numerous advertising contracts, and in interviews she often tells the story of how she had just  in her bank account when she started the show but walked away with  when it ended. She was later ranked 18th on Forbes Korea'''s Top 40 Celebrities in 2011, and among the Top 7 Female Commercial Stars in Korea as compiled by Ilgan Sports.

In February 2010, Hwang hosted MBC's Star Dance Battle together with Kim Shin-young, Oh Sang-jin, and Shin Bong-sun. Later in December, she was also one of the co-hosts of the annual music program SBS Gayo Daejeon along with Super Junior's Kim Hee-chul, CNBLUE's Jung Yong-hwa, and 2AM's Jo Kwon.

Hwang then began to regularly acts in television series. In 2010-2012, she starred in the 1970s historical epic Giant, melodrama romance Listen to My Heart (2011) in which Hwang received a leading role for the first time, and medical drama Golden Time (2012). 

In 2013 Hwang was cast in crime comedy Incarnation of Money. In the same year she acted in TV ratings-hit melodrama crime Secret Love, which resulted in multiple awards-winning for Hwang at the 2013 KBS Drama Awards. The next year, she led the 1980-1990s set period drama, Endless Love. 

In 2015, Hwang reunited with some of her former costars, namely Ji Sung from Secret Love for the romantic comedy series Kill Me, Heal Me; then with Park Seo-joon from Kill Me, Heal Me and Go Joon-hee from Listen to My Heart for another romantic comedy, She Was Pretty, which also further solidifies her popularity in China. Ize magazine named her as one of the 10 Persons of the Year and Hwang was selected as Gallup Korea's Television Actor of the Year in 2015. The two MBC's series also brought multiple awards for Hwang at the 2015 MBC Drama Awards.

Hwang was cast in her first big screen leading role in the 2015 romantic comedy film My Sister, the Pig Lady, which was screened at the 39th Montreal World Film Festival as part of their World Greats selection. The film also won Grand Prize at the 2016 Osaka Asian Film Festival.

Less than a month after her marriage, Hwang has been cast in the 2016 romantic comedy series, Lucky Romance. She was then reunited with Namkoong Min, whom she had starred alongside seven years ago in Listen to My Heart, in 2018 rom-com The Undateables.

In 2020, Hwang has been cast in two drama series, a fantasy mystery Mystic Pop-up Bar and romantic comedy Men Are Men.

Hwang accepts the offer to star in the new work of well-known screenwriter Kim Soon-ok with 2023 SBS mystery crime The Escape of the Seven. 

 Personal life 
Hwang dated Kim Yong-jun for nine years. They first met in 2005, when Hwang starred in the SG Wannabe music video for My Heart's Treasure Box. The couple then publicly confirmed their relationship in January 2008. Yonhap News Agency broke the news on May 15, 2015, that the couple had ended their relationship after she wrapped up the filming of Kill Me, Heal Me. Hwang later confirmed it in her interview with KBS2's Entertainment Relay''.

On December 8, 2015, Hwang's agency, C-JeS Entertainment, confirmed that she had been dating Lee Young-don, a professional golfer and businessman, for the past four months. On January 7, 2016, Hwang announced her planned marriage to Lee Young-don, with the ceremony to be held in February. On February 26, 2016, the wedding reception was held at Hotel Shilla, Seoul.

Hwang was confirmed to be four months pregnant in February 2017 and gave birth to their first child, a son, on August 15, 2017.

On September 3, 2020, after four years of marriage, Hwang's agency C-JeS Entertainment announced that Hwang had submitted an application for divorce and would start the divorce mediation process.

On July 9, 2021, agency C-JeS Entertainment announced that Hwang and her husband had mediated their divorce and decided to continue their relationship.  Both of them decided to live together.

On October 12, 2021, Hwang's agency announced that is pregnant with her second child. and was expected to give birth the next year. On March 16, 2022 she gave birth to a baby boy, her second son.

Filmography

Television series

Film

Variety show

Music video

Discography

Digital single

Collaboration

Awards and nominations

Listicles

References

External links 

 Hwang Jung-eum at C-JeS Entertainment
  
 

1985 births
Living people
South Korean television actresses
South Korean film actresses
21st-century South Korean actresses
Actresses from Seoul
IHQ (company) artists
South Korean female idols
21st-century South Korean singers
21st-century South Korean women singers
Singers from Seoul
University of Suwon alumni